Per Terje Vold (born 6 April 1945) is a Norwegian civil servant and businessperson.

He grew up at the farm Engan near Røros, and attended school in Røros and Orkdal. He studied science at the University of Oslo and economics at the Norwegian School of Economics and Business Administration, and started his career in the Ministry of Industry and the Ministry of Petroleum and Energy. He then worked in the Organisation for Economic Co-operation and Development and Storebrand. He was an executive in Storebrand from 1992 to 1994, but was fired by the board of directors after the Airbus scandal, in which he was even sentenced to eighteen days of prison for tax irregularities.

After Storebrand he worked in Statoil. He has also been a board member of DnB NOR and Oslo Jazzfestival. On 1 January 1998 he became the new director of the Federation of Norwegian Process Industries, a position he left in 2004. He was succeeded by Stein Lier-Hansen. Vold was then director of the Norwegian Oil Industry Association in February 2004. He was succeeded by Gro Brækken on 1 January 2010. He intended to move back to the family farm in Røros. Before this he resided in Hosle.

References

1945 births
Living people
Norwegian businesspeople in insurance
Norwegian businesspeople in the oil industry
Norwegian civil servants
Norwegian expatriates in France
University of Oslo alumni
Norwegian School of Economics alumni
Equinor people
Norwegian prisoners and detainees
Prisoners and detainees of Norway
People from Røros